Wooldale is a small village nestled on a hill, overlooking the Kirkroyds area of New Mill, Holmfirth in West Yorkshire, England. It has a population of 2,420.

Co-operative Society
The village was the base of the Wooldale Co-operative Society, a small consumer co-operative. The Society operated three convenience stores in the Holme Valley one in Wooldale and the others were in the villages of New Mill and Thongsbridge. The Society was founded in 1886.

The Society was a member of the CRTG (Co-operative Retail Trading Group) and a corporate member of the Co-operative Group. It had agreements with the United Co-op and later the Co-operative Group for stock distribution and promotions.

In 2017 the society was taken over by the Central England Co-operative Society.

Sport
Wooldale Wanderers AFC are the local football team, competing in the Huddersfield District League and play at Westfield Park just outside the village centre.

References

External links

Wooldale Co-operative website

Holme Valley
Geography of Kirklees
Villages in West Yorkshire
Towns and villages of the Peak District